Hydroxyestradiol means the hydroxylation products of estradiol and its analogues, may refer to:

Hydroxyestradiol
 2-Hydroxyestradiol
 4-Hydroxyestradiol
 15α-Hydroxyestradiol
 Estriol (16α-hydroxyestradiol)
 Epiestriol (16β-hydroxyestradiol)

Hydroxyepiestradiol
 17α-Epiestriol (16α-hydroxyepiestradiol)
 16β,17α-Epiestriol (16β-hydroxyepiestradiol)

Dihydroxyestradiol
 Estetrol (15α,16α-dihydroxyestradiol)
 2-Hydroxyestriol
 4-Hydroxyestriol